Live! Bootleg is a double live album by American hard rock band Aerosmith, released in October 1978. While most of the performances were drawn from concerts in 1977 and 1978, "I Ain't Got You" and "Mother Popcorn" were taken from a radio broadcast of a Boston performance on March 20, 1973.

Background
The design of the album is intended to ape the poor production values offered by contemporary bootleg records, even going so far as to give an incorrect track listing: the song "Draw the Line" is included on the record but does not appear listed; the track is a secret track after "Mother Popcorn". The album also features a secret live instrumental cover of "Strangers in the Night" inserted into their cover of "Train Kept A-Rollin'", which was probably a nod to a similar quote by Jimi Hendrix during "Wild Thing" at the Monterey Pop Festival. The back of the CD cover includes two coffee stains over the picture of Joe Perry playing before a live audience. The original LP cover had the coffee stains, but not the picture of Perry, which was part of the gatefold artwork. The record also features one of Aerosmith's first live versions of The Beatles "Come Together", which they performed in the 1978 movie Sgt. Pepper's Lonely Hearts Club Band, and the first record appearance of Richie Supa's "Chip Away the Stone" (the studio version of this song would later be released on 1988's Gems compilation).

In the band memoir Walk this Way, Perry recalls, "I didn't want to do a live album at the time because there were so many perfect live albums coming out, all doctored and fixed and overdubbed. Big deal. Double live album - 'standard of the industry'. I felt like we had to avoid that and do a real live album like Live at Leeds or Get Yer Ya Ya's Out or that old Kinks album." In his own 2014 memoir Rocks, Perry confessed that the idea behind the LP confounded their label Columbia:

Track listing

[*] "Draw the Line" is featured as a hidden track at the end of "Mother Popcorn"

Personnel
Aerosmith
Steven Tylerlead vocals, harmonica
Joe Perryguitar
Brad Whitfordguitar
Tom Hamiltonbass guitar
Joey Kramerdrums, percussion

Additional musicians
Mark Radice – keyboards, backing vocals
David Woodford – saxophone on "Mother Popcorn"

Production
Jack Douglas – producer, engineer
David Krebs, Steve Leber – executive producers, management 
Jay Messina, Lee DeCarlo – engineers
Julie Last, Rod O'Brien, Sam Ginsburg – assistant engineers
David Hewitt – Record Plant Mobile operator (New York)
Chris Stone – Record Plant Mobile operator (Los Angeles)
George Marino – mastering at Sterling Sound, New York
John Kosh – art direction, design
Jimmy Ienner Jr., Barry Levine, Ron Pownall, Aaron Rapoport, Steve Smith – photography

Charts

Weekly charts

Year-end charts

Certifications

References

Bibliography

1978 live albums
Aerosmith live albums
Albums produced by Jack Douglas (record producer)
Columbia Records live albums